"Believe in Me" is a single released by André Tanneberger (ATB) from his album Seven Years: 1998-2005.

CD single track listings

Believe in Me (Germany Release) 
 "Believe in Me" (Single Edit) 3:16 
 "Believe in Me" (Airplay Mix) 4:00
 "Believe in Me" (Clubb Mix) 8:01
 "Believe in Me" (A&T Remix) 7:23

Believe in Me (US Release)
 "Believe in Me" (Single Edit) 3:17 
 "Believe in Me" (Airplay Mix) 4:01
 "Believe in Me" (Clubb Mix) 8:00
 "Believe in Me" (A&T Remix) 7:24
 "Believe in Me" (DJ Antoine Main Mix) 6:58

Charts

2005 singles
ATB songs
Songs written by André Tanneberger
2005 songs